The Department of Public Instruction may refer to:

 Department of Education (Philippines), previously called the Department of Public Instruction
 Department of Education (Queensland). previously called the Department of Public Instruction